Regional elections were held in Denmark in March 1935. 299 members of the county councils of Denmark were elected.

Results of regional elections
The results of the regional elections:

Amt Councils

References

Local and municipal elections in Denmark
Local